"Woman (Sensuous Woman)" is a 1972 single by Don Gibson.  "Woman (Sensuous Woman)" was Don Gibson's final number one on the country charts spending one week at the top and a total of sixteen weeks on the charts.  Other artists released their versions of "Woman (Sensuous Woman)," including Ray Charles on his 1984 album "Do I Ever Cross Your Mind," and Mark Chesnutt, whose version under the title "Woman, Sensuous Woman" peaked at #21 in the Country Music charts.

Charts

Don Gibson version

Mark Chesnutt version

References

1972 singles
1994 singles
Don Gibson songs
Ray Charles songs
Mark Chesnutt songs
MCA Records singles
Song recordings produced by Mark Wright (record producer)
1972 songs
Songs written by Gary S. Paxton